Narberth is a town and community in Pembrokeshire, Wales. It was founded around a Welsh court and later became a Norman stronghold on the Landsker Line. It became the headquarters of the hundred of Narberth.  It was once a marcher borough. George Owen described it in 1603 as one of nine Pembrokeshire "boroughs in decay".

In 2011, the population was 2,150, of which a third are Welsh-speaking.
Narberth is close to the A40 trunk road and is on the A478. Narberth railway station is on the main line from Swansea. The community includes the village of Crinow.

Etymology 
The Welsh name of the town, is a compound of  "on, against" +  "hedge" (cf. Perth in Scotland). The phrase  "in Narberth" was rebracketed when borrowed into English, giving the present-day English name, Narberth.

History
In the Iron Age, there was a defended enclosure to the south of the current town centre on Camp Hill.
Narberth was founded around a Welsh court, but later became a Norman stronghold on the Landsker Line. It became the headquarters of the hundred of Narberth.  It was once a marcher borough. George Owen described it in 1603 as one of nine Pembrokeshire "boroughs in decay".
There is a First World War memorial in Market Square with further inscriptions added after the Second World War.

Mythology
The town plays a high-profile role in Welsh mythology, where it is the chief palace of Pwyll, Prince of Dyfed, and a key setting in both the first and third branches of the Mabinogi. A drama specially adapted for children based on the story of Culhwch and Olwen from the Mabinogion was staged at Narberth Castle when it was reopened to the public in 2005.

Facilities and attractions

Attractions in the town include several art galleries, the Narberth Museum, Narberth Town Hall, which still houses the cell where the leaders of the Rebecca Riots were imprisoned, and a ruined castle. Narberth has a range of independent shops, including a Daily Telegraph sponsored 'Best Traditional Business', national award-winning butcher, women's boutiques, gift shops and has developed a reputation as an antiques centre. In 2014 The Guardian called it "not only a gastronomic hub for west Wales but also one of the liveliest, most likeable little towns in the UK".

Other attractions near to Narberth include Blackpool Mill, at the highest tidal reach of the River Cleddau, where Eurasian otters and other wildlife may be seen and Oakwood Theme Park.

The town's cultural and arts centre, the Queen's Hall, has recently played host to live bands such as Therapy?, The Blockheads, The Automatic, Sonic Boom Six, Skindred, Send More Paramedics, Pendulum and Enter Shikari. Concerts, plays and many classes, such as Kung Fu, yoga and line dancing are held there, also elton john played his first ever gig here, and it has a contemporary art gallery and a restaurant. The Grove hotel also provides restaurant facilities as well as accommodation and caters for special events.

The Bloomfield House Community Centre, a Community association and a registered charity is in Narberth.

Narberth was named one of the best places to live in Wales in 2017.

There are 70 listed buildings in Narberth community.

Events 

Narberth Food Festival has taken place on the fourth weekend of September every year since 1998. The festival features celebrity chefs, cookery demonstrations, music, entertainment and children's activities.

Narberth Civic Week is held during the last full week of July and includes a parade through the town to one of the churches, where a service is held to welcome the newly appointed Mayor. In 2008, the Civic Service was held in the grounds of Narberth Castle for the first time. During Civic Week, there are various activities arranged for children, families and visitors to the town. The culmination of Civic Week is the annual Carnival Day Parade, a tradition dating back over 100 years. Narberth's Winter Carnival, held in December, was revived in 2009, after a break of 4 years.

The town is also home to the Narberth A Cappella Voice Festival, which began in 2008 and is described as Wales' only a cappella festival. It celebrated its tenth anniversary in May 2018.

Governance
Narberth is in the Carmarthen West and South Pembrokeshire (UK Parliament constituency) and the Carmarthen West and South Pembrokeshire (Assembly constituency).

Narberth elects a Town Council, which in turn elects a mayor annually. The current mayor is Cllr. Glynis Meredydd and the deputy mayor is Cllr. Elizabeth Rogers

A county councillor is elected to Pembrokeshire County Council every five years from each of Narberth's two local government wards, Narberth (town) and Narberth Rural. In the May 2017 election, independent candidate Elwyn Morse was elected unopposed as county councillor for Narberth Rural.

Administrative history
The ancient parish of Narberth had split into two civil parishes by the nineteenth century, called Narberth North (which included the built up area of the town itself) and Narberth South (where the main settlement was Templeton). When parish and district councils were established in 1894 both Narberth North and Narberth South parishes were included in the Narberth Rural District. Narberth Urban District was created on 1 April 1902, covering a new civil parish called Narberth which was created from part of the Narberth North parish. Narberth South and the reduced Narberth North parish stayed in the Narberth Rural District.

Narberth Urban District Council met at Narberth Town Hall in the High Street. By 1958 the council had also established its main offices at Bank House at 6 St James Street.

Narberth Urban District was abolished under the Local Government Act 1972, merging with other nearby districts to become South Pembrokeshire on 1 April 1974. South Pembrokeshire in turn was abolished in 1996 to become part of a re-established Pembrokeshire.

Notable people
Sir Thomas Foley was born in Llawhaden, near Narberth. A contemporary of Lord Nelson, he was a senior naval officer at the battles of the Nile and Copenhagen.

The footballer Joe Allen was raised and educated in the town.

Twinning 
Narberth is twinned with Ludlow, and both towns celebrate an annual food festival.

Sport 
Narberth is home to several sporting teams, including Narberth Rugby Football Club who currently play in the Welsh Championship, Narberth Football Club, and a cricket club.

References

External links 

Photographs of Narberth and surrounding area on Geograph
Historical information on GENUKI

 
Towns in Pembrokeshire
Communities in Pembrokeshire